At least two ships of the Hellenic Navy have borne the name Ierax ("hawk"):

  an  acquired in 1912 and decommissioned in 1946.
  a  launched in 1944 as USS Ebert she was transferred to Greece in 1951 and renamed. She was sunk as a target in 2002.

Hellenic Navy ship names